Aimee Olexy is an American restaurateur who, with Stephen Starr owns The Love in Philadelphia. They also co-own Talula's Table and Talula's Garden.

Biography
Olexey grew up in West Chester, Pennsylvania. In the late 1980s, as a teenager, her first restaurant job was in Conshohocken, Pennsylvania at Spring Mill Café. She attended St. Joseph’s University where she earned a degree in English literature followed by a MBA. She went on to France and attended l’Universitie du Vin.

Career
In 1999, she returned to Philadelphia and got jobs relating to operations in the restaurant industry. Her first job with Starr was as general manager of Blue Angel, his Center City, Philadelphia bistro.

With ex-husband Bryan Sikora, she opened Django on Society Hill which earned a four bell rating from Craig LaBan of The Philadelphia Inquirer.

Awards and honors
The Love was named one of the best new restaurants of 2018 by Esquire (magazine).

References

External links
Talula’s Garden Must Pay Nearly $400K for Labor Violations
Feds Investigating Alleged Wage Theft at Stephen Starr Restaurant

American women restaurateurs
Living people
Year of birth missing (living people)
People from West Chester, Pennsylvania